2011 European Youth Olympic Festival may refer to:

2011 European Youth Summer Olympic Festival
2011 European Youth Olympic Winter Festival